Kuzminovka is a rural locality (a village) in Semyonkinsky Selsoviet, Aurgazinsky District, Bashkortostan, Russia. The population was 50 as of 2010. There is 1 street.

Geography 
Kuzminovka is located 37 km southwest of Tolbazy (the district's administrative centre) by road. Nizhny Begenyash is the nearest rural locality.

References 

Rural localities in Aurgazinsky District